Gemechu Woyecha (born 3 February 1979) is an Australian long-distance runner who specializes in the marathon.

He was born in Ethiopia, and also represented Qatar formerly, under the name Rashid Khaled Jamal. He competed in the 2000 Olympic marathon, but did not finish the race. He later defected to Australia. In his new home country he won the 2004 Gold Coast Marathon.

His personal best time is 2:14:50 hours, achieved in 2001. As an Australian citizen his best mark is 2:15.27 hours, achieved when he finished eighth at the 2008 Nagano Marathon.

Achievements
All results regarding marathon, unless stated otherwise

References

1979 births
Living people
Australian male long-distance runners
Ethiopian male long-distance runners
Ethiopian male marathon runners
Qatari male long-distance runners
Athletes (track and field) at the 2000 Summer Olympics
Olympic athletes of Qatar
Naturalised citizens of Qatar
Australian male marathon runners
Qatari male marathon runners